Esmaeil Esmaeili is an Iranian football manager who manages Nassaji in Persian Gulf Pro League. He played as a player for Nassaji and Sepidrood.

On 11 May 2022, Esmaeili became head coach of Nassaji in Persian Gulf Pro League, replacing Saket Elhami.

References

External links

Living people
Iranian football managers
People from Qaem Shahr
Iranian footballers
F.C. Nassaji Mazandaran managers
Nassaji Mazandaran players
Sepidrood Rasht players
Sportspeople from Mazandaran province
Year of birth missing (living people)